The Byrds were an American rock band, formed in Los Angeles, California in 1964. The term was also the name of several eponymous albums:

The 1970 release, (Untitled)
The 1973 album, titled simply Byrds (album)
The 1990 box set, The Byrds (box set)

See also
Byrds albums